Snider Peak is an 8,250-foot (2,515 meter) dacitic dome summit located in the Wrangell Mountains, in the U.S. state of Alaska. Precipitation runoff from the mountain drains into the Dadina and Nadina Rivers which are both tributaries of the Copper River. The peak's name may have been the name of an early prospector as reported in 1903 by the US Geological Survey.

Climate

Based on the Köppen climate classification, Snider Peak is located in a subarctic climate zone with long, cold, snowy winters, and mild summers. Weather fronts coming off the Gulf of Alaska are forced upwards by the Wrangell Mountains (orographic lift), causing precipitation in the form of rainfall and snowfall. Temperatures can drop below −20 °F with wind chill factors below −30 °F. The months May through June offer the most favorable weather for viewing and climbing.

See also
 
List of mountain peaks of Alaska
Geography of Alaska

References

External links
 Weather forecast: Snider Peak

Mountains of Alaska
Landforms of Copper River Census Area, Alaska
Wrangell–St. Elias National Park and Preserve
North American 2000 m summits